Mark Schlabach (born in Knox, Indiana) is an American sports journalist, New York Times best-selling author, columnist, and reporter for ESPN.com.

Schlabach joined ESPN.com in July 2006 as a college football and college basketball columnist.  He is notable during college football season for the weekly "On the Mark" column and is a regular contributor to ESPN programs like Outside the Lines, College Football Live, The Experts, and SportsCenter.

Schlabach graduated from the University of Georgia. He is a member of Sigma Nu fraternity. He spent nine years at The Atlanta Journal-Constitution, covering University of Georgia, the Southeastern Conference, the NFL, and NASCAR. Later, Schlabach spent two years at The Washington Post covering college football, college basketball, and boxing.

Schlabach is the author of nearly one dozen books, including the New York Times best sellers Called to Coach: Reflections on Life, Faith, and Football, a collaboration with former Florida State football coach Bobby Bowden; The Duck Commander Family: How Faith, Family and Ducks Built a Dynasty, a collaboration with Duck Commander CEO Willie Robertson and his wife Korie Robertson; and Happy, Happy, Happy: My Life and Legacy as the Duck Commander, and unPHILtered: The Way I See It, which were collaborations with Duck Dynasty's Phil Robertson.  Schlabach is also the co-author of the New York Times bestseller, Sicology 1: Tales and Wisdom from Duck Dynasty's Favorite Uncle, a collaboration with Duck Dynasty star Si Robertson, and Good Call: Reflections on Faith, Family and Fowl, a collaboration with Duck Dynasty's Jase Robertson.

On May 19, 2013, Happy, Happy, Happy debuted as the No. 1 best-selling nonfiction book and e-book on The New York Times Best Sellers list. In September 2013, Schlabach had three books he co-authored on the New York Times bestsellers list simultaneously -- Sicology 1 was ranked No. 1, Happy, Happy, Happy was No. 3 and The Duck Commander Family was No. 9. Good Call: Reflections Faith, Family and Fowl debuted at No. 6 on May 25, 2014, and UnPhiltered debuted at No. 2 on September 21, 2014.

Schlabach is also the co-author of Heisman: The Man Behind the Trophy and other college football books about the University of Florida, Florida State University, University of Georgia, and Virginia Tech. Schlabach's tweets on Deandre Ayton's wiretapping controversy came under some fire with some questioning Schlabach's knowledge, involvement, and motives for such tweets.

Schlabach lives in Madison, Georgia with his wife and three children.

Bibliography 
 Destiny's Dogs: Georgia's Championship Season (2003) 
 What It Means to Be a Hokie (2006) 
 What It Means to Be a Seminole (2007) 
 What It Means to be a Gator (2008) 
 Georgia Football: Yesterday & Today (2009) 
 Called to Coach: Reflections on Life, Faith, and Football (2010) 
 Always a Hokie: Players, Coaches, and Fans Share Their Passion for Hokies Football (2011) 
 Heisman: The Man Behind the Trophy (2012) 
 The Duck Commander Family: How Faith, Family and Ducks Built a Dynasty (2012) 
 Happy, Happy, Happy: My Life and Legacy and the Duck Commander (2013) 
 Sicology 1: Tales and Wisdom from Duck Dynasty's Favorite Uncle (2013) 
 Good Call: Reflections on Faith, Family, and Fowl (2013) 
 unPHILtered: The Way I See It (2014) 
 "Death Row Chaplain: Unbelievable True Stories from America's Most Notorious Prison" (2015) 
 Inseparable: How Family and Sacrifice Forged a Path to the NFL (2019) with Shaquem Griffin and Shaquill Griffin

References

External links 
ESPN.com bio and archive

1972 births
Living people
American sports journalists
People from Knox, Indiana
People from Madison, Georgia
Sigma Nu
University of Georgia alumni